Marion Manville Pope (Manville; July 13, 1859 – December 22, 1930) was an American poet and author of juvenile literature. Pope was a woman of liberal education with varied talents and accomplishments. After marriage, she made Valparaíso, Chile, her permanent home. Her writings inspired the allegorical sculpture, The End of the Trail by James Earle Fraser (1915).

Early life and education
Marion (nickname, "Minnie") Augusta Manville was born in La Crosse, Wisconsin, July 13, 1859. She was the daughter of Marvin Madison Monroe Manville and Helen A. Manville. Pope was an active, intelligent and precocious child. In her early childhood, she wrote verses in great numbers, and most of her work was surprisingly good for someone of her age.

She was a pupil of the Lyceum School in New York City.

Career
Some of her earlier productions were included with later ones in Pope's first published book, Over the Divide (Philadelphia, 1888). The volume passed through several editions, and the critics received it favorably. Many of the poems contained in the book were read by dramatic readers. Her poems found wide circulation, but she believed that her best work was her prose fiction. Her love for children led her to write for them, and in their behalf, she contributed both prose and verse to St. Nicholas Magazine, Wide Awake, Our Little Ones, The Nursery, Babyhood, and other periodicals devoted to the young. "Her work shows, not only true poetic gifts, but also ... careful thinking and proper attention to form... Her poems are clear-cut and finely polished."

Pope's writings inspired the allegorical sculpture, The End of the Trail by James Earle Fraser (1915).

Of Up the matterhorn in a boat, the Harford Post review in Book News: An Illustrated Magazine of Literature and Books (1897), said of it:—

The Delineator (1898) provided a review as well, saying:—

Personal life
On September 22, 1891, she married Charles Alvin Pope, FRGS, author, of Valparaíso, Chile, and she made that city her permanent home. Her travels thereafter included Cuba and Mexico.

Pope was a dramatic reader, and an artist of merit. Her work included crayon, oils, and pen and ink. She modeled well, and some of her heads were genuinely artistic. She was a social favorite in society.

Marion Manville Pope died in Neuilly, France, December 22, 1930.

Selected works

By Marion Manville
 Over the divide and other verses, 1888

By Marion Manville Pope
 A judicial error, 1896
 Up the matterhorn in a boat, 1897
 Between two gods : [an allegory], 1917

References

Attribution

Bibliography

External links
 
 

1859 births
Writers from La Crosse, Wisconsin
People from Valparaíso
19th-century American poets
19th-century American women writers
American women poets
American children's writers
Poets from Wisconsin
Year of death missing
Wikipedia articles incorporating text from A Woman of the Century